Syed Razak bin Syed Zain Barakhbah (22 August 1944–8 March 2023) is a Malaysian politician. He is a member of the United Malays National Organisation (UMNO), a component party in Barisan Nasional (BN) coalition. He was the Menteri Besar of Kedah from 11 December 1999 to 22 December 2005.

Early life
Syed Razak is a successful bumiputera entrepreneur in business. His success can be considered comparable to the non-Malay entrepreneurs. His integrity in business caused him to be entrusted to lead the Chamber of Commerce and Industry Kedah Malay (DPPMMK) since 1986 again.  Through the Chamber of Commerce and Industry Kedah Malay (DPPMMK),  Syed Razak, trying desperately to bring Bumiputera businessmen towards commercial and industrial community in line with the objectives of Wawasan 2020 to make Malaysia a developed nation.

Death
Syed Razak died on 8 March 2023, at age of 79 due to health problem. He was buried at Masjid Nurul Ehsan Muslim Cemetery, Kubang Rotan, Kuala Kedah.

Honours
  :
  Member of the Order of the Defender of the Realm (AMN)
  Officer of the Order of the Defender of the Realm (KMN) 
  :
  Knight Companion of the Order of Loyalty to the Royal House of Kedah (DSDK) - Dato' (1990)
 Knight Grand Companion of the Order of Loyalty to the Royal House of Kedah (SSDK) – Dato' Seri (2003)
  Member of the Supreme Order of Sri Mahawangsa (DMK) – Dato' Seri Utama (2005)
  :
  Grand Commander of the Order of Malacca (DGSM) – Datuk Seri (2004)

References

1944 births
Living people
People from Kedah
Malaysian people of Malay descent
Malaysian Muslims
United Malays National Organisation politicians
Members of the Kedah State Legislative Assembly